Berkaber is a village in the Ijevan Municipality of the Tavush Province of Armenia.

Toponymy 
The village was previously known as Dzhogaz, Joghaz and Pipis.

Gallery

References

External links 

Populated places in Tavush Province